Fry Cook on Venus is a 2011 studio album by Canadian hip hop artist Noah23, released on Fake Four Inc. Music videos were produced for "Bright Green Laces" and "Intangible Heart Crescendo".

Critical reception
Vish Khanna of Exclaim! gave the album a favorable review, saying: "Artful as always, Noah23's weirdest album yet finds the gifted MC singing more than ever, but any cheeriness is tempered by the gritty beats and dark soundscapes."

Track listing

Personnel
Credits adapted from liner notes.

 Noah23 – vocals
 Oskar Ohlson – production (1)
 Zoën – production (2, 6, 12, 13)
 Awol One – vocals (3)
 Sole – vocals (3)
 Ceschi – production (3, 8), vocals (7)
 Factor – production (4)
 Madadam – production (5, 11)
 Myka 9 – vocals (7)
 Skyrider – production (7)
 Liz Powell – vocals (9)
 Cars & Trains – production (9)
 Evan Gordon – guitar (9)
 Rickolus – production (10), vocals (10)
 Ghettosocks – vocals (12)
 Buddy Peace – turntables (12)
 Gregory Pepper – production (14), vocals (14)
 Jeremy Goody – mixing, mastering
 Justin Lovato – artwork
 Michael Crigler – layout

References

External links
 
 

2011 albums
Noah23 albums
Fake Four Inc. albums
Albums produced by Factor (producer)